Andrew Foley (c. 1748 – 28 July 1818) was a British Member of Parliament.

He was the third son of Thomas, 1st Lord Foley and educated in Oxford.

Unlike his two elder brothers, he did not greatly dissipate the family wealth.  His father devised to him estates in and around Newent, Gloucestershire that had been in the family for several generations. He was a trustee of his father's will, together with his father's younger brother, the Very Reverend Robert Foley, Dean of Worcester.

Andrew Foley sat continuously as member of Parliament for Droitwich, long represented by members of his family, from 1774 until his death.

He died in 1818. He had married Elizabeth, daughter and heir of Boulter Tomlinson, and left two sons, Thomas and William Andrew (neither of whom married) and four daughters.

References

Burke's Peerage
Will of 1st Lord Foley.

1748 births
1818 deaths
People from Newent
Members of the Parliament of Great Britain for English constituencies
British MPs 1774–1780
British MPs 1780–1784
British MPs 1784–1790
British MPs 1790–1796
British MPs 1796–1800
Members of the Parliament of the United Kingdom for English constituencies
UK MPs 1801–1802
UK MPs 1802–1806
UK MPs 1806–1807
UK MPs 1807–1812
UK MPs 1812–1818
Younger sons of barons
Andrew